Peter Fairclough may refer to:
 Peter Fairclough (cricketer)
 Peter Fairclough (footballer)